Liski (also Romanized as Līskī; also known as Yeskī, Līkī, and Līsk Soflá) is a village in Arabkhaneh Rural District, Shusef District, Nehbandan County, South Khorasan Province, Iran. At the 2006 census, its population was 19, in 7 families.

References 

Populated places in Nehbandan County